The Visual Monitoring Camera (VMC), also known as the Video Monitoring Camera and Mars Webcam, is a small camera mounted on Mars Express spacecraft. It is operated by the Mars Express Flight Control Team at ESOC in Darmstadt, Germany. Originally, VMC was a technical camera to monitor the separation of the Beagle 2 lander, but after a few years, it was repurposed into Mars Webcam, streaming its data to the web and even being used for science.

Starting in 2007, the VMC was used for the Mars Webcam project, where it takes global views of Mars at a high cadence and they are posted online. The VMC is a camera-on-chip design, using the IRIS-1 system. Originally used as engineering monitoring camera for the Beagle 2 lander, it has a wide 40° field of view and limited imaging controls and it has no focus mechanism. In 2016, it was used for professional science in addition to its roles as a technical monitoring camera and public outreach.

History 
The camera was included on the Mars Express mission with the singular goal of monitoring the deployment of the Beagle 2 lander, which occurred on 19 December 2003 at 08:31 UTC. After performing this task, the VMC remained unused, having no intended scientific purpose. In 2007, it was checked out and turned on for educational and science outreach. The Mars Webcam project was born and proved popular with the public, offering wide-angle shots of Mars on a regular basis.

The VMC was adopted as a science instrument in early 2016, in a collaboration between ESA and the University of the Basque Country Planetary Sciences Group. This collaboration will conduct a two-year study of the images returned by VMC, which provide a global view of the planet and allow for the study of planetary phenomena, including changes in the ice caps, dust storms and cloud activity.

The European Space Agency occasionally establishes campaigns inviting people to propose targets to be imaged by the cameras, such as the event on 25–27 May 2015.

, more than 21,000 images had been returned. New images are published to the camera's Flickr account in a fully automated process as they are received from the spacecraft, sometimes in as little as 75 minutes from when the photograph was taken at Mars. All images produced by the VMC are released under a Creative Commons Attribution/ShareAlike license (CC BY-SA 3.0 IGO).

Technical specifications 
Specifications of the VMC are:
 CMOS based (IMEC IRIS-1)
 B/W + RGB filters
 Image size: 640×480 pixels
 Pixel depth: 8 bits
 Field of view: 40×31 degrees
 Approximate distance from Mars surface: 
 Calculated resolution at 300 km: 
 Calculated resolution at 10,000 km: 
 Mass: 
 Size:

Observation targets 
Noted observations:
Beagle 2
Mars
2018 Martian dust storm

See also 
JunoCam (another Education/Public outreach space camera on a space probe)

Notes

References

External links 
 Mars Webcam Photostream at Flickr.com
 Mars Webcam Blog by the European Space Agency
An ordinary camera in an extraordinary location: Outreach with the Mars Webcam

Mars Express
Mars imagers